Tomotaka Endo (born 28 January 1995 in Brisbane) is a Japanese professional squash player. As of March 2020, he was ranked number 81 in the world, and number 1 in Japan. The world ranking is the highest ever for the Japan men's squash history.  He won the 2018 Queensland Open, becoming the first Japanese player ever to win a professional PSA Tour tournament.

References

1995 births
Living people
Japanese male squash players
Squash players at the 2018 Asian Games
Asian Games competitors for Japan